A nuclear reactor coolant is a coolant in a nuclear reactor used to remove heat from the nuclear reactor core and transfer it to electrical generators and the environment.
Frequently, a chain of two coolant loops are used because the primary coolant loop takes on short-term radioactivity from the reactor.

Water
Almost all currently operating nuclear power plants are light water reactors using ordinary water under high pressure as coolant and neutron moderator.
About 1/3 are boiling water reactors where the primary coolant undergoes phase transition to steam inside the reactor.
About 2/3 are pressurized water reactors at even higher pressure.
Current reactors stay under the critical point at around 374 °C and 218 bar where the distinction between liquid and gas disappears, which limits thermal efficiency, but the proposed supercritical water reactor would operate above this point.

Heavy water reactors use deuterium oxide which has identical properties to ordinary water but much lower neutron capture, allowing more thorough moderation.

Disadvantages

Tritium leak
As the hydrogen atoms in water coolants are bombarded with neutrons, some absorb a neutron to become deuterium, and then some become radioactive tritium. Water contaminated with tritium sometimes leaks to groundwater by accident or by official approval.

Hydrogen explosion 
Fuel rods create high temperatures which boil water into steam. During a power outage, diesel power generators which provide emergency power to water pumps may be damaged by a tsunami, earthquake or both; if no fresh water is being pumped to cool the fuel rods then the fuel rods continue to heat up. Once the fuel rods reach more than 1200°C, the zirconium tubes that contain the nuclear fuel will interact with the steam and split hydrogen from water molecules. This hydrogen may leak from breaches in the reactor core and containment vessel. If hydrogen accumulates in sufficient quantities - concentrations of 4% or more in the air - then it can explode, as has apparently occurred at Fukushima Daiichi reactors No. 1, 3, and 4. 

Such an explosion was avoided at 
Reactor No. 2, which opened its vent to let out hydrogen, decreasing pressure by releasing radioactive hydrogen gas.

Borated water 
Borated water is used as a coolant during normal operation of pressurized water reactors (PWRs) as well as in Emergency Core Cooling Systems (ECCS) of both PWRs and boiling water reactors (BWRs).

Advantages 
Boron, often in the form of boric acid or sodium borate, is combined with water — a cheap and plentiful resource — where it acts as a coolant to remove heat from the reactor core and transfers the heat to a secondary circuit. Part of the secondary circuit is the steam generator that is used to turn turbines and generate electricity. Borated water also provides the additional benefits of acting as a neutron poison due to its large neutron absorption cross-section, where it absorbs excess neutrons to help control the fission rate of the reactor. Thus, the reactivity of the nuclear reactor can be easily adjusted by changing the boron concentration in the coolant. That is, when the boron concentration is increased (boration) by dissolving more boric acid into the coolant, the reactivity of the reactor is decreased. Conversely, when the boron concentration is decreased (dilution) by adding more water, the reactivity of the reactor is increased.

Disadvantages 
Approximately 90% of the tritium in PWR coolants is produced by reactions of boron-10 with neutrons. Since tritium itself is a radioactive isotope of hydrogen, the coolant becomes contaminated with radioactive isotopes and must be kept from leaking into the environment. Additionally, this effect must be taken into account for longer cycles of nuclear reactor operation and thus requires higher initial concentration of boron in the coolant.

Molten metal
Fast reactors have a high power density and do not need, and must avoid, neutron moderation. Most have been liquid metal cooled reactors using molten sodium. Lead, lead-bismuth eutectic, and other metals have also been proposed and occasionally used. Mercury was used in the first fast reactor.

Molten salt
Molten salts share with metals the advantage of low vapor pressure even at high temperatures, and are less chemically reactive than sodium. Salts containing light elements like FLiBe can also provide moderation. In the Molten-Salt Reactor Experiment it even served as a solvent carrying the nuclear fuel.

Gas

Gases have also been used as coolant. Helium is extremely inert both chemically and with respect to nuclear reactions but has a low heat capacity,

Hydrocarbons
Organically moderated and cooled reactors were an early concept studied, using hydrocarbons as coolant. They were not successful.

References

Sodium as a Fast Reactor Coolant, Thomas Fanning, ANL Compares sodium favorably to lead and helium.

External links